Eva Klímková is a Czech model and winner of the contest Elite Model Look Czech Republic and also the international contest Elite Model Look International 2013.

References

External links
 Eva Klímková at Munich Models.

1997 births
Czech female models
Living people
Models from Prague